Agatha may refer to:

Agatha (given name), a feminine given name
Agatha, Alberta, a locality in Canada
List of storms named Agatha, tropical storms and hurricanes
Operation Agatha, a 1946 British police and military operation in Mandatory Palestine
Agatha (genus), a genus of gastropods
Agatha (film), a 1979 film about Agatha Christie
Agatha: Coven of Chaos, an upcoming television series based on the Marvel Comics character Agatha Harkness
Agatha Award, for mystery and crime writers